Marriage Contract and Country Dancing is a c. 1711 oil-on-canvas painting by French artist Antoine Watteau. It entered the Spanish royal collection as part of the collection of Isabella Farnese and was recorded in the La Granja de San Ildefonso Palace in Segovia. It is now in the Prado Museum, in Madrid. It shows the signing of a marriage contract in a rural landscape.

References

Further reading

External links
 
 The Marriage Contract at the Web Gallery of Art

Paintings of the Museo del Prado by French artists
Paintings by Antoine Watteau
1710s paintings